Dmytro Leonkin (16 December 1928 – 1980) was a Soviet gymnast who competed in the 1952 Summer Olympics and presented athletes of the Ukrainian SSR. Dmytro Leonkin was born in Ryazan Governorate, Russian SFSR.

References

1928 births
1980 deaths
Ukrainian male artistic gymnasts
Soviet male artistic gymnasts
Olympic gymnasts of the Soviet Union
Gymnasts at the 1952 Summer Olympics
Olympic gold medalists for the Soviet Union
Olympic bronze medalists for the Soviet Union
Olympic medalists in gymnastics
People from Sasovsky District
People from Ryazan Governorate
Russian emigrants to Ukraine
Medalists at the 1952 Summer Olympics
Sportspeople from Ryazan Oblast